The List of original Douglas DC-3 operators lists only the original customers who purchased new aircraft.

With the availability of large numbers of surplus military C-47 Skytrains or Dakotas after the Second World War, nearly every airline and military force in the 1940s and 1950s operated the aircraft at some point. More than eighty years after the type's first flight, in the second decade of the 21st century the Douglas DC-3 is still in commercial operation.

Commercial operators

Australia
Australian National Airways (ANA)

Belgium
Sabena

Brazil
Real Transportes Aéreos 
Varig 
VASP

Czechoslovakia
 (ČLS)

France
Air France

Hong Kong
 Cathay Pacific
India
Indian Airlines

Indonesia
 Garuda Indonesia
Ireland
Aer Lingus

Kenya
 Speedbird Airways

Netherlands
KLM

Japan
Far East Fur Trading
Great Northern Airways
 Imperial Japanese Airways 
 Japan Air Transport 
Pakistan
Pakistan International Airlines

Peru
PANAGRA

Romania
LARES

Russia
Mongolian Transport Company
Northeast

Sweden
AB Aerotransport

Switzerland
Swissair

United States
American Airlines
Braniff Airways
Capital Airlines - the only purchaser of the DC-3S Super DC-3 post-war variant
Chicago and Southern Air Lines
Canadian Colonial Airlines
Delta Air Lines
Eastern Air Lines
Hawaiian Airlines
Northeast
Northwest Airlines
Pan American-Grace Airways
Pan American World Airways
Pennsylvania Central Airlines
Transcontinental & Western Air
United Airlines
Western Air Express

Business and Executive operators
United States
Civil Aeronautics Authority
Swiftflite Inc

Military operators
Nicaragua

Nicaraguan Air Force

United States

United States Army Air Corps/United States Army Air Forces
Includes aircraft built for the Royal Netherlands East Indies Army Air Force but taken over before delivery following the Japanese occupation of the Dutch East Indies

United States Navy

See also
List of Douglas C-47 Skytrain operators

Notes

References

Bibliography 

DC-3
Operators